Lorenzo Calafiore (31 January 1935 – 20 October 2011) was a Greco-Roman wrestler from Italy who won two medals at the European championships of 1969–1970. He competed at the 1972 Summer Olympics, aged 37, and finished in sixth place.

Biography
His father Francis died of a heart attack when Calafiore was a few months old. Soon after that his mother, Josephine Agostini, married Antonio Mauro, a widower with four children. The pair later had ten more children. Calafiore took up wrestling aged 20; at 26 he won his first national title and was included to the national team. On 2 May 1965 he married Catherine Logiudice; they had two children, Francis (born 1966) and Giuseppina (born 1969). Calafiore retired from competitions in 1974, and two years later started working as a coach. He retired for good in 2000 to help raising his grandchildren. He died of a heart attack in 2011.

References

External links
 

1935 births
Olympic wrestlers of Italy
Wrestlers at the 1972 Summer Olympics
Italian male sport wrestlers
2011 deaths
Mediterranean Games gold medalists for Italy
Competitors at the 1971 Mediterranean Games
Mediterranean Games medalists in wrestling